Mountain Avenue is a New Jersey Transit station in Montclair in Essex County, New Jersey, United States, along the Montclair-Boonton Line. The station is located on Upper Mountain Avenue, which gives the station its name.

The station is the fifth stop in Montclair along the line heading towards Hackettstown and Dover, and the second heading towards Hoboken Terminal. This station building, constructed in 1893, is used as a private residence, and is on lease from the railway.

Station layout
The station's low-level side platforms are not wheelchair accessible. Weekend service is not provided.

Bibliography

References

External links
  

 Station House from Google Maps Street View

NJ Transit Rail Operations stations
Montclair, New Jersey
Railway stations in Essex County, New Jersey
Railway stations on the National Register of Historic Places in New Jersey
Upper Montclair, New Jersey
Former Erie Railroad stations
Queen Anne architecture in New Jersey
Railway stations in the United States opened in 1873
1873 establishments in New Jersey